Albertinus may refer to:

Albertinus de Virga, 15th-century Venetian cartographer
Phyllonorycter albertinus, a moth of the family Gracillariidae

See also
Albertine (disambiguation)
Albertus (given name)